The 2002 German Formula Three Championship  was a multi-event motor racing championship for single-seat open wheel formula racing cars that was held across Europe. The championship featured drivers competing in two-litre Formula Three racing cars built by Dallara which conformed to the technical regulations, or formula, for the championship. It commenced on 20 April at Hockenheim and ended at the same place on 6 October after ten double-header rounds.

Team Rosberg driver Gary Paffett became the first and only British champion. He won the title, securing six race wins. Kosuke Matsuura finished as runner-up with wins at Hockenheim and Zandvoort. Timo Glock won  the Rookie title and three races with a one-point gap to Matsuura in the main championship. The other race winners were Frank Diefenbacher, Jeffrey van Hooydonk, Norbert Siedler, Markus Winkelhock and Kimmo Liimatainen.

Teams and drivers
All drivers competed in Dallara chassis; model listed.

Calendar

Results

Championship standings

Championship
Points were awarded as follows:

† — Drivers did not finish the race, but were classified as they completed over 90% of the race distance.

Junior-Pokal (Rookie) standings

References

German Formula Three Championship seasons
Formula Three season
German
German Formula 3